Alainosquilla is a monotypic genus of crustaceans belonging to the monotypic family Alainosquillidae. The only species is Alainosquilla foresti.

The species is found in Southeastern Asia and Australia.

References

Stomatopoda
Monotypic crustacean genera